Akkamma Cherian was an Indian independence activist from Travancore (Kerala), India. She was popularly known as the Jhansi Rani of Travancore.

Early life and education 
She was born on 14 February 1909 in a Roman Catholic family (Karippaparambil) at Kanjirapally, Travancore, as the second daughter of Thomman Cherian and Annamma Karippaparambil. She was educated at Government Girls High School, Kanjirapally and St. Joseph's High School, Changanacherry. She earned a BA in History from St. Teresa's College, Ernakulam.

After completing her education in 1931, she worked as a teacher at St. Mary's English Medium School, edakkara), where she later became head mistress. She worked in this institution for about six years, and during this period she also did her L. T. degree from Tri Training College.

Freedom fighter 
In February 1938, the Travancore State Congress was formed and Accamma gave up her teaching career to join the struggle for liberty.

Agitation for a responsible government

Civil disobedience movement
Under the State Congress, the people of Travancore started an agitation for a responsible government. C. P. Ramaswami Aiyar, the Dewan of Travancore, decided to suppress the agitation. On 26 August 1938, he banned the State Congress which then organised a civil disobedience movement. Prominent State Congress leaders including its President Pattom A. Thanu Pillai were arrested and put behind bars. The State Congress then decided to change its method of agitation. Its working committee was dissolved and the president was given dictatorial powers and the right to nominate his successor. Eleven 'dictators' (Presidents) of the State Congress were arrested one by one. Kuttanad Ramakrishna Pillai, the eleventh dictator, before his arrest nominated Accamma Cherian as the twelfth dictator.

Rally to the Kowdiar Palace

Accamma Cherian led a mass rally from Thampanoor to the Kowdiar Palace of the Maharaja Chithira Thirunal Balarama Varma to revoke a ban on State Congress. The agitating mob also demanded the dismissal of the Dewan, C. P. Ramaswami Aiyar, against whom the State Congress leaders had levelled several charges. The British police chief ordered his men to fire on the rally of over 20,000 people . Accamma Cherian cried, "I am the leader; shoot me first before you kill others". Her courageous words forced the police authorities to withdraw their orders. On hearing the news M. K. Gandhi hailed her as 'The Jhansi Rani of Travancore'. She was arrested and convicted for violating prohibitory orders in 1939.

Formation of Desasevika Sangh

In October 1938, the working committee of the State Congress directed Accamma Cherian to organise the Desasevika Sangh (Female Volunteer Group). She toured various centres and appealed to the women to join as members of the Desasevika Sangh.

Imprisonments
Accamma had been imprisoned twice during her struggle for independence.

The Annual conference of the State Congress
The first annual conference of the State Congress was held at Vattiyoorkavu on 22 and 23 December 1932 in spite of the ban orders. Almost all leaders of the State Congress were arrested and imprisoned. Accamma, along with her sister Rosamma Punnose (also a freedom fighter, M.L.A., and a CPI leader from 1948), was arrested and jailed on 24 December 1939. They were sentenced to a year's imprisonment. They were insulted and threatened in the jail. Due to the instruction given by the jail authorities, some prisoners used abusing and vulgar words against them. This matter was brought to the notice of M.K. Gandhi by Pattom A. Thanu Pillai. C. P. Ramaswami Iyer, however, denied it. Accamma's brother, K. C. Varkey Karippaparambil also took part in freedom movement.

Quit India Movement

Accamma, after her release from jail, became a full-time worker of the State Congress. In 1942, she became its Acting President. In her presidential address, she welcomed the Quit India Resolution passed at the historic Bombay session of the Indian National Congress on 8 August 1942. She was arrested and awarded one year imprisonment. In 1946, she was arrested and imprisoned for six months for violating ban orders. In 1947, she was again arrested as she raised her voice against C. P. Ramaswami Aiyar's desire for an independent Travancore.

Life in Independent India 
In 1947, after independence, Accamma was elected unopposed to the Travancore Legislative Assembly from Kanjirapally. In 1951, she married V.V. Varkey Mannamplackal, a freedom fighter and a member of Travancore Cochin Legislative Assembly. They had one son, George V. Varkey, an engineer. In the early 1950s, she resigned from the Congress Party after being denied a Lok Sabha ticket and in 1952, she unsuccessfully contested the parliamentary election from Muvattupuzha constituency as an independent. In the early 1950s, when the parties ideologies were changing, she quit politics. Her husband V. V. Varkey Mannamplackal, Chirakkadavu. served as an MLA in the Kerala Legislative Assembly from 1952 to 1954. In 1967, she contested the Assembly election from Kanjirapally as a Congress candidate but was defeated by the Communist Party's candidate. Later, she served as a member of the Freedom Fighters' Pension Advisory Board.

Death and commemoration 

Accamma Cherian died on 5 May 1982. A statue was erected in her memory in Vellayambalam, Thiruvananthapuram.
A documentary film was made on her life by Sreebala K. Menon.

References

1909 births
1982 deaths
Politicians from Kottayam
Women of the Kingdom of Travancore
People of the Kingdom of Travancore
Indian National Congress politicians from Kerala
Indian independence activists from Kerala
Indian rebels
Indian women in war
Malayali politicians
Women in Kerala politics
Women in war 1900–1945
Women Indian independence activists
Indian people of World War II
Indian women of World War II
Military personnel from Kerala
20th-century Indian women politicians
20th-century Indian politicians
Activists from Kerala
Travancore–Cochin MLAs 1949–1952
Vazhappally
St. Teresa's College alumni